= Bernice Lake (California) =

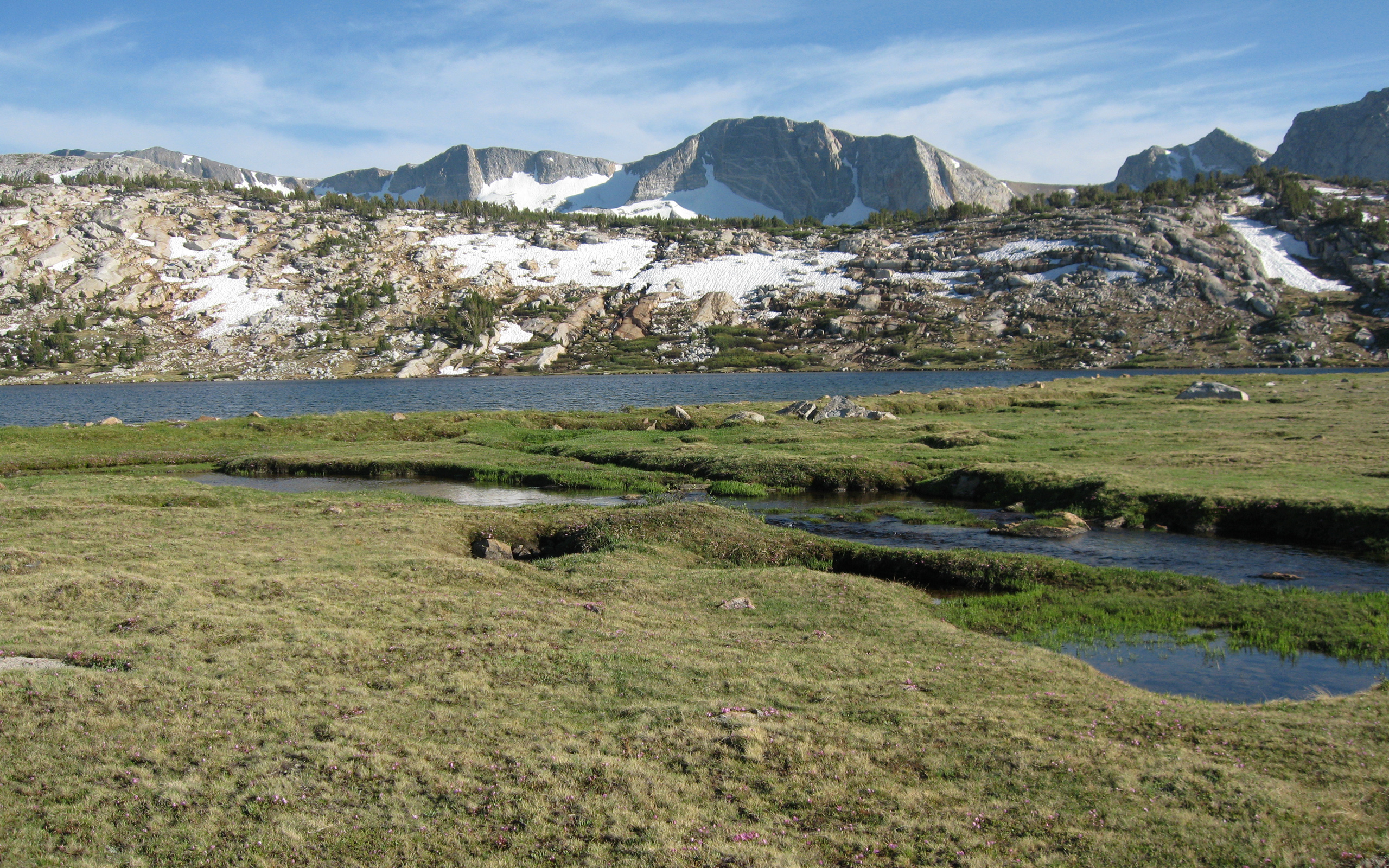

- Location within California Location within the United States
- Location: Yosemite National Park, Mariposa County, California
- Coordinates: 37°45′59″N 119°19′58″W
- Type: Lake
- Surface elevation: 10,220 feet (3,120 m)

Bernice Lake is a lake in Yosemite National Park, United States.

Bernice Lake was named for the wife of a park official.

== See also ==
- List of lakes in California
